The 1996 Brabantse Pijl was the 36th edition of the Brabantse Pijl cycle race and was held on 31 March 1996. The race started and finished in Alsemberg. The race was won by Johan Museeuw.

General classification

References

1996
Brabantse Pijl